Whitney High School can refer to:

 Whitney High School (Cerritos, California) 
 Whitney High School (Rocklin, California)
 Whitney High School (Texas) in Whitney, Texas
 Whitney High School (Toledo, Ohio), closed in 1991